Penagos is a municipality located in the autonomous community of Cantabria, Spain. It has a population of 2,020 inhabitants (2013).

Localities 
 Arenal.
 Cabárceno.
 Llanos.
 Penagos (Capital).
 Sobarzo.

References

Municipalities in Cantabria